Viktor Ivanovich Nikitenko (born July 3, 1947) is a Russian professional football coach and a former player.

Nikitenko had multiple spells as caretaker manager of Russian First Division sides FC Lokomotiv St. Petersburg and FC Baltika Kaliningrad.

External links
Profile at Footballfacts.ru

1947 births
Living people
Soviet footballers
Russian football managers
FC Baltika Kaliningrad managers
Association football midfielders